Henriette de Coligny de La Suze (1618 – March 10, 1673) was a French writer.

Early life
She was one of four children born to Anne de Polignac and Gaspard de Coligny, Duc de Châtillon, who served under Louis XIII, and was appointed Marshal of France in 1622.

Her paternal grandfaher was François de Coligny and her great-grandfather was the Huguenot leader Admiral Gaspard de Coligny.

Writing career
In 1666, she published a collection of 21 of her poems as Poésies de Madame la Comtesse de La Suze but she also contributed verse and prose to many other collected works. Ninety-five of her poems appear in "L'amour raisonnable", part of Recueil de pièces galantes en prose et en vers; each poem is preceded by a preamble in prose.

Personal life
She was married twice: first, in 1643, to Thomas Hamilton, 3rd Earl of Haddington, who died in February 1645, and then, in 1647, to Gaspard de Champagne, comte de la Suze. Originally a Protestant, she converted to Catholicism in 1653. Her second marriage was annulled in 1661 on the grounds of impotence.

Legacy
De La Suze was admired by the writers Madeleine de Scudéry and Paul Pellisson.

References 

1618 births
1673 deaths
French poets
French women poets
House of Coligny
Haddington